Jackson v. Bishop, 404 F.2d 571 (8th Cir. 1968) was a case decided in 1968 on the Eighth Circuit Court of Appeals of the United States by then-judge Harry Blackmun. It abolished corporal punishment in the Arkansas prison system.

Issue
The issue in the case was how to apply the Eighth Amendment's prohibition against cruel and unusual punishment to the conditions within a prison.

Background
Arkansas rules authorized prison officials to beat inmates with a five-foot leather strap known as a "bull hide." An earlier suit had resulted in a decision permitting the use of the strap, provided that "appropriate safeguards" were in place.

Blackmun's writings
Few precedents had existed for applying the Eighth Amendment to prison conditions. In pre-opinion writings, Blackmun wrote that constitutional standards evolve, as opposed to remaining static; he noted that nearly every state had abandoned corporal punishment in prison. Blackmun supported banning corporal punishment in prisons entirely.

Opinion
Blackmun held that use of the strap in question is punishment that "runs afoul" of the Eighth Amendment. He wrote that "any so-called safeguard is entirely unworkable" and that the strap "is abhorrent to public opinion."

Reception
Blackmun's opinion received favorable notice from both the judicial and public community.

References

United States Court of Appeals for the Eighth Circuit cases
Cruel and Unusual Punishment Clause case law
1968 in United States case law
Penal system in Arkansas
1968 in Arkansas
Corporal punishment case law